Spaven is a surname. Notable people with the surname include:
 Jack Spaven (1891–1971), English footballer
 Scott Spaven (born 1990), English rugby league player